Elizabeth Gavis is an American biologist who is the Damon B. Pfeiffer Professor of Life Sciences, at Princeton University. Gavis served as the President of the North American Drosophila Board of Directors in 2011.

Early life and education 
Gavis was an undergraduate student at Yale University, where she majored in biology and graduated suma cum laude. She spent her summer holidays as a summer fellow in the Carnegie Institution for Science, working in the department of embryology, and the Johns Hopkins University. Gavis completed her thesis research in the laboratory of Joseph G. Gall. She moved to the Stanford University School of Medicine for her graduate research, where she earned an MD–PhD in 1990. She was based in the research group of David Hogness. During her doctoral studies Gavis worked on the Bithorax complex. She became increasingly interested in genetics, and particularly developmental gene regulation.

Research and career 
Gavis joined the laboratory of Ruth Lehmann at the Whitehead Institute. She was appointed to the faculty at Princeton University in 1994, where she would be promoted to Professor in 2008 and the Damon B. Pfeiffer Endowed Professor in 2016. Gavis spent a year on sabbatical at the University of Cambridge, where she worked with Andrea Brand.

Gavis makes use of Drosophila as a model organism to study Messenger RNA (mRNA) localisation, translation, stability and degradation. She has used single molecule imaging to identify how various mRNAs localise to the back of a developing Drosophila egg. She showed that these mRNAs pack into highly ordered germ granules, which are segregated into germ cell progenitors and their development.

She investigated the hnRNP F/H RNA binding protein Glorund and demonstrated it uses a novel mode of interaction to both bind and repress the RNAS. This mode of interaction may regulate their splicing.

Academic service 
Gavis has held various positions in the Genetics Society of America, including serving as the President of the Drosophila Board of Directors. In this capacity she established the Victoria Finnerty Undergraduate Travel Award, which looked to support undergraduate students to  attend the Annual Drosophila Conference. She is also involved with science communication activities with the general public.

Selected publications

References 

American women biologists
Living people
Year of birth missing (living people)
Yale University alumni
21st-century American biologists
Princeton University faculty
Stanford University School of Medicine alumni
American medical researchers
21st-century American women